Babylon A.D. is a 2008 science fiction action film based on the 1999 novel Babylon Babies by Maurice Georges Dantec. The film was directed by Mathieu Kassovitz and stars Vin Diesel in the lead role, Mélanie Thierry, Michelle Yeoh, Lambert Wilson, Mark Strong, Jérôme Le Banner, Charlotte Rampling, and Gérard Depardieu. It was released on 29 August 2008 in the United States.  It is an international co-production between France, the United Kingdom, and the United States.

Plot
In a dystopian near-future, Russian mobster Gorsky (Depardieu) hires the mercenary Toorop (Diesel) to bring a young woman known only as Aurora (Thierry) from Asia to New York City. Gorsky gives Toorop a variety of weapons and a subdermally implanted UN passport. Toorop, the girl, and her guardian Sister Rebeka (Yeoh), travel from the Noelite Convent in Kyrgyzstan to reach New York via Russia.

Unlike in the technologically advanced U.S., war and terrorist activity have transformed Russia's cities into dangerous, overpopulated slums. The stress of humanity's situation causes Aurora to act out in strange ways and display clairvoyance abilities. On one such occasion, Aurora, seemingly for no reason, panics and runs from a crowded train station, just before it explodes in a terrorist attack.

The protagonists must also evade an unknown group of mercenaries claiming to have been sent by Aurora's supposedly dead father. Later, they board a submarine that carries refugees to Canada. To avoid satellite detection, the Captain of the submarine orders his crew to dive and he shoots some of the refugees still trying to get on board. Aurora, infuriated by the loss of life, operates the 30-year-old submarine without training. Sister Rebeka tells Toorop that Aurora could speak nineteen different languages by the age of two, and always seems to know things she has never learned. Three months before leaving with Toorop, she began acting differently. This occurred after a Noelite doctor administered a pill. The doctor told her to go to New York City and arranged for Toorop to escort them.

After arriving in Alaska with help from Toorop's associate Finn (Strong), the protagonists are attacked by weaponized drones. Toorop manages to destroy all the drones, but also gets wounded. These perils cause Finn to betray the group, so Toorop shoots him dead.

Once in Harlem, a news broadcast about the bombing of the Kyrgyzstan convent causes the group to realize there is more going on than they know. The Noelites have become a major new salvationist religion, which vast numbers of people cling to as the world spirals out of control. However, in private meetings, it is seen that their High Priestess (Charlotte Rampling) only desires power and uses invented miracles to court converts. Gorsky, working for the Noelites, had planted a tracking device in Toorop's passport and bombed the convent when he knew they were in the United States. The doctor who earlier saw Aurora examines her again in a hotel room. When he leaves, Aurora reveals (without being told) that she is pregnant with twins despite being a virgin.

Looking outside the hotel, Toorop sees Gorsky's men and the Noelite group, heavily armed and waiting for them on the street. The High Priestess calls Toorop and asks him to bring Aurora outside. Just before they take her away, Toorop changes his mind and starts a firefight with the two groups to get the two women to safety. Gorsky's men fire guided missiles at Toorop that track his subdermal passport. Rebeka gets killed defending Aurora, who in turn shoots Toorop, saying, "I need you to live." Toorop's clinical death causes the guided missile to go off target (missing Toorop) and explode near Aurora instead; she inexplicably survives.

Dr. Arthur Darquandier (Lambert Wilson) revives Toorop using advanced medical techniques, but several of Toorop's body parts are replaced with cybernetics to undo the damage of being dead for over two hours. Darquandier explains that when Aurora was a fetus, he implanted a supercomputer into her brain. It is also implied that the Noelite group had him create Aurora to become pregnant at a certain time to use her as a "virgin birth". After she was born, the Noelites hired Gorsky to kill Darquandier, but he failed. Darquandier remained "dead" until he found his daughter in Russia with Toorop.

Darquandier uses a machine to scan Toorop's memory to find out what Aurora said to him before and shortly after shooting him. In Toorop's memory, Aurora tells Toorop to "go home". Toorop and several of Darquandier's men leave the facility. En route to Darquandier's lab, Gorsky calls the High Priestess, demanding payment; during the subsequent videocall the High Priestess kills Gorsky by nuclear missile. The High Priestess confronts and kills Darquandier, but Toorop has already escaped. Toorop goes to his old house in the forest, finds Aurora, and takes her to a hospital, where, 6 months later, she dies after giving birth. Aurora was "designed to breed", not to live, so her death after childbirth was preprogrammed. Toorop takes care of her two children.

In a scene that is only present in the theatrical cut but was removed from the director's cut, the twins are shown to be one that looks like Aurora and the other like Toorop.

Cast
 Vin Diesel as Hugo Toorop, a mercenary and a former Marine (full name is "Hugo Cornelius Toorop" in the Babylon Babies novel). He is a professional smuggler from upstate New York, who has been deported to Eastern Europe where he does mercenary jobs as a smuggler. He's an expert in advanced weaponry, hand-to-hand combat, tactics and culinary.
 Michelle Yeoh as Sister Rebeka, a nun from an ascetic branch of the Noelites. She's originally from San Francisco. When she was 17-years-old, she joined the Noelites in order to escape an abusive relationship. She ended up in their Mongolian convent where she became Aurora's guardian.
 Mélanie Thierry as Aurora, a young woman who's been given shelter by the Noelite nuns. Since when she was a child, she showed supernatural knowledge in all kind of fields and by the age of two she was already able to speak 19 languages. She can also sense danger.
 Gérard Depardieu as Gorsky, a wealthy Russian mobster who hires Toorop to transport Aurora to the United States on behalf of the Noelite Church. He owns a private army and lives inside an APC fitted like a limo, constantly surrounded by a convoy of his soldiers.
 Charlotte Rampling as the CEO of the Noelite church. She does not really care about the religion, and only seeks power and wealth. She is planning to use science to produce miracles, thus extending the popularity and reach of her church.
 Mark Strong as Finn, a Russian smuggler who's an old associate of Toorop's. He is ready to help transport Aurora across borders, yet Toorop doesn't entirely trust him.
 Lambert Wilson as Dr. Arthur Darquandier, Aurora's disabled father who was presumed to be dead.
 David Belle as Hacker Kid, the leader of Darquandier's henchmen who are following Toorop and Aurora to America.
 Jérôme Le Banner as Killa, an underground fighter.

Production

Development
Mathieu Kassovitz worked on an English-language film adaptation of Maurice Georges Dantec's French novel Babylon Babies for five years; in June 2005, this project got financing from StudioCanal and Twentieth Century Fox. The adapted screenplay was written by Kassovitz and screenwriter Éric Besnard.  Production was initially slated to begin in February 2006 in Canada and Eastern Europe.

Casting
French actor Vincent Cassel was initially sought to be cast in the lead role. In February 2006, actor Vin Diesel entered negotiations to star in the film, titled Babylon A.D., dropping out of the lead role of Hitman in the process.

Filming
The shooting schedule was slated to begin in June 2006. By February 2007, filming was slated to wrap in April to release Babylon A.D. in time for the coming Thanksgiving. In February, filming took place at Barrandov Studios. In March 2007, the filming crew, having shot in the Czech Republic, took a two-week hiatus to deal with uncooperative weather, such as the lack of snow, and problems with set construction.  Crew members scouted Iceland for locations with snow to shoot six to eight days of footage, which was supposed to be done in February.  Filming was also done with the leads Diesel, Michelle Yeoh, and Mélanie Thierry in Ostrava in March. The French visual effects company BUF Compagnie was contracted to develop the film's effects under the supervision of Stephane Ceretti.

In April 2007, Babylon A.D. was reported to be over-budget and three weeks behind schedule. A lack of snow meant a skiing sequence to be shot in Eastern Europe had to be moved to Sweden. Later in the month, actor Lambert Wilson was cast into the film. Filming was completed in May 2007.

American artist Khem Caigan designed the sigil that appears as a tattoo on the right side of Toorop's neck – an emblem which originally appeared in the Schlangekraft Necronomicon in 1977.

Mathieu Kassovitz said that 20th Century Fox interfered throughout production, and he never had a chance to shoot a scene the way it was scripted, or the way he wanted it to be. A French language documentary of the troubled creation of the film entitled Fucking Kassovitz was released in 2011.

Music
The music of Babylon A.D. was written by Icelandic composer Atli Örvarsson. The music supervisor of the movie was Jérôme Hadey. The musical alliance Achozen, represented by Shavo Odadjian and RZA performed the score for the film.  Music producer Hans Zimmer described the intended style: "Musically, our objective was to merge the sounds and energies of hip hop with classical music, seamlessly melting them into an unusual soundscape."

Release
Babylon A.D. was originally stated to be released in the United States on 29 February 2008, but its release was postponed to 29 August 2008. As of 31 January 2009, the film had grossed $72,105,690 worldwide. In the US the film was placed #2 behind Tropic Thunder with $9,484,627 in 3,390 cinemas with a $2,798 average.

Reception
On Metacritic it has a score of 26% based on 15 reviews, indicating "Generally unfavorable reviews". On Rotten Tomatoes the film has a 6% approval rating based on 104 reviews (96 negative, 6 positive) with the consensus calling it "a poorly constructed, derivative sci-fi stinker with a weak script and poor action sequences." Audiences surveyed by CinemaScore gave the film a grade D+ on scale of A to F.

Jordan Mintzer of Variety called it "A noisier, costlier version of "Children of Men," yet lacking that film's social-political significance and jaw-dropping direction."

Home media
Babylon A.D. was released on Blu-ray and DVD in Europe (Region 2) on 29 December 2008, and in the United States (Region 1) on 6 January 2009. At the same time, the French 101-minute version was released on Blu-ray in the US as Babylon A.D. – Raw and Uncut.

References

External links

 
 
 
 
 
 

2008 films
2008 science fiction action films
American science fiction action films
British science fiction action films
French science fiction action films
2000s English-language films
Films based on Canadian novels
Films based on science fiction novels
20th Century Fox films
Dune Entertainment films
StudioCanal films
Films set in Serbia
Films set in Russia
Films set in New York City
Films set in 2027
Films directed by Mathieu Kassovitz
Films scored by Atli Örvarsson
Films shot in the Czech Republic
American dystopian films
2000s dystopian films
English-language French films
Films set in Belgrade
Films shot in Belgrade
Films about the Russian Mafia
Films shot at Barrandov Studios
Films about mercenaries
2000s American films
2000s British films
2000s French films